"Szampan" is a song recorded by Polish singer Sanah. The song was released as the first single from her debut studio album Królowa dram on 3 January 2020 through Magic Records, and was written by Sanah, Magdalena Wójcik, and Kuba Galiński, while production was handled by Galiński.

The single reached number 1 on the Polish Airplay Chart and was certified diamond.

Music video 
A music video to accompany the release of "Szampan" was released on 3 January 2020 through Sanah's Vevo channel. It was produced in collaboration with THEDREAMS Studio.

Track listing

Charts

Weekly charts

Year-end charts

Certifications

Release history

References

2019 songs
2020 singles
Number-one singles in Poland
Polish-language songs
Sanah (singer) songs